PVSA may refer to:

Passenger Vessel Services Act of 1886
Pleasant View School for the Arts
Post Vasectomy Semen Analysis 
President's Volunteer Service Award